Pralenik is a village in the municipality of Centar Župa, North Macedonia.

Demographics
The village is inhabited by a Turkish speaking population consisting of Turks.

As of the 2021 census, Pralenik had 144 residents with the following ethnic composition:
Turks 137
Persons for whom data are taken from administrative sources 7

According to the 2002 census, the village had a total of 177 inhabitants. Ethnic groups in the village include:
Turks 176
Others 1

References

Villages in Centar Župa Municipality
Turkish communities in North Macedonia